CodeHS is an interactive online learning platform offering computer science and programming instruction for schools and individual learners. CodeHS is focused on spreading access to and knowledge of computer science by offering online instructional materials supported by remote tutors. In the introductory learning module, students on the site practice computer science concepts and programming skills by giving commands to a dog named Karel. In the most popular course offered, which is similar to the original Karel programming language developed by Richard E. Pattis, Karel the dog must complete various tasks by moving around a grid world, and putting down and picking up tennis balls using only simple commands. Later learning modules teach more advanced concepts using languages like JavaScript, Java, and HTML.

History
CodeHS was founded in 2012 by Jeremy Keeshin and Zach Galant, both Stanford University Computer Science graduates. Keeshin and Galant based CodeHS on their experience as section leaders and teaching assistants for several of Stanford's introductory computer science courses. The company joined the Imagine K12 incubator's third class, launching in October 2012, and its investors include NewSchools Venture Fund, Seven Peaks Ventures, Kapor Capital, Learn Capital, Imagine K12, Marc Bell Ventures, and Lighter Capital. In total, CodeHS has raised $2.9 million as of December 2016.

NBC Education Nation

CodeHS was selected as one of three education technology companies to take part in the 2013 Innovation Challenge, part of the NBC Education Nation initiative. Innovation Nation challenge participants CodeHS, Teachley, and GigaBryte participated in a series of challenges in October 2013, culminating in a live pitch contest broadcast live on NBC during the Education Nation Summit. CodeHS won the Innovation Challenge, earning a $75,000 prize awarded by the Robin Hood Foundation.

Hour of Code
During the week of December 9, 2013, CodeHS participated in the nationwide Hour of Code challenge promoted by Code.org. CodeHS was featured as a tutorial for learning JavaScript on the Computer Science Education Week website. Over the course of the week, an estimated 116,648 participants started learning to code for an hour on CodeHS.

Karel the Dog
The first learning module on CodeHS teaches introductory programming concepts by having students give basic commands to Karel the Dog using Karel-specific JavaScript commands. This approach is based on the original Karel programming language developed by Richard E. Pattis and is used in Stanford University's introductory computer science classes. Karel initially knows only a few basic commands: move(); to have Karel move one spot forward, turnLeft(); to have Karel turn left, putBall(); to have Karel put down one tennis ball in the current spot, and takeBall(); to have Karel pick up one tennis ball from the current spot. Karel can be "taught" additional commands by defining new functions composed of these basic commands. The programmer can also use elements like loops and conditionals to control the flow of the program.  

After Karel the dog, Tracy the turtle was introduced.

Superkarel
Karel evolves into Superkarel and gains the ability to turnRight() and turnAround().

Example
The following is an example of a simple program to have Karel repeat a series of commands (put down a tennis ball, move, turn left, move, then turn right) three times:

Reception
CodeHS received significant media coverage upon its launch, including articles in the Forbes, TechCrunch, and Education Week. The site has also been featured on various blogs for its interactive and beginner-focused approach to teaching programming.

See also

 Blended learning
 Karel (programming language)
 Code.org
 Codecademy
 CodeCombat
 Khan Academy
 Team Treehouse
 Udacity

References

External links
CodeHS
CodeHS Blog

American educational websites
Computer programming
Privately held companies of the United States